Ponce Salt Industries, Inc. was a manufacturer of salt based in Ponce, Puerto Rico. During its operating years, it dominated the salt market in Puerto Rico.

History
Ponce Salt Industries was founded as Productos Salinos de Tallaboa on 30 June 1951 by Juan E. Mayoral Renovales, Jorge Martín, and Rafael Pou Vives. Juan E. Mayoral Renovales had also been the founder of Ponce Candy Industries. The company had locations in Barrio Encarnacion, Peñuelas, Puerto Rico, and at the Port of Ponce. Its Peñuelas location was at latitude 17.993038, longitude -66.720403 (a.k.a., 17° 59' 34.9362" and -66° 43' 13.4508"), where it had 71 acres of space.

Operational profile
The company operated salt ponds in the extreme southwestern part of Puerto Rico and, in 1963, produced 6,000 tons of salt for use in the tannery and fishing and fish canning industries. It also imported some 12,000 tons of salt from Great Inagua, Bahamas, to refine into table salt.  The company was a corporation under the Puerto Rico Industrial Development Plan.  To support its import/export operations, in 1995 it rented warehouse space from the Ponce Municipal Government at the Port of Ponce warehouse facilities.  The company operated until 1980.

References

External links
 Phase I Environmental Site Assessment Former Ponce Salt Industries, State Road PR-2, Km 215, Encarnacion Ward, Peñuelas, Puerto Rico. Environmental Resource Technologies (ERTEC). DISUR Project PET 029; ERTEC Project E135222. 10 December 2014. Prepared for: Desarrollo Integral del Sur, Inc. (DISUR), 742 Tito Castro Ave., Suite 103, Ponce, Puerto Rico, 00716. Prepared By: Environmental Consultants (ERTEC) San Juan, Puerto Rico.

Companies based in Ponce, Puerto Rico
Food and drink companies established in 1951
1951 establishments in Puerto Rico
Privately held companies of Puerto Rico
Puerto Rican brands
Food and drink companies of Puerto Rico